Norman William Plitt (February 21, 1893 in York, Pennsylvania – February 1, 1954 in New York City) was a pitcher in Major League Baseball. He pitched in one game for the Brooklyn Robins during the 1918 baseball season and then nine years later pitched for the Brooklyn Robins and the New York Giants in 1927.

He began his professional career with the Hanover Hornets and Chambersburg Maroons of the Blue Ridge League in 1915.  Between his major league stints, he continued to play minor league baseball.  His last season was in 1931 with the Elmira Colonels of the New York Penn League. He was found dead in a dormitory at Columbia University, where his son had been attending, at age 60.

External links

1893 births
1954 deaths
Baseball players from Pennsylvania
Sportspeople from York, Pennsylvania
Major League Baseball pitchers
Brooklyn Robins players
New York Giants (NL) players
Hanover Hornets players
Chambersburg Maroons players
Portland Duffs players
Waterbury Nattatucks players
Reading Coal Barons players
Los Angeles Angels (minor league) players
Allentown Dukes players
Reading Keystones players
Elmira Colonels players